Patrick Clark may refer to:

Patrick Clark (wrestler) (born 1995), American professional wrestler
Patrick Clark (bishop) (1908–1954), Canadian bishop
Patrick Clark (chef) (1955–1998), American chef
Patrick Ryan Clark (born 1977), American Christian musician

See also
Patrick Clarke (fl. 1990s–2020s), Irish writer, director, producer and actor
Patrick Clarke (American football) (born 1991), American football placekicker